Andrej Čaušić (born 19 February 1990) is a Croatian football defender who currently plays for NK Vardarac.

References
Profile at HLSZ

1990 births
Living people
People from Osijek
Association football central defenders
Croatian footballers
NK Osijek players
NK Olimpija Osijek players
Pécsi MFC players
FC DAC 1904 Dunajská Streda players
Kozármisleny SE footballers
Szeged 2011 players
Croatian Football League players
Slovak Super Liga players
Nemzeti Bajnokság I players
Nemzeti Bajnokság II players
Croatian expatriate footballers
Expatriate footballers in Hungary
Expatriate footballers in Slovakia
Croatian expatriate sportspeople in Hungary
Croatian expatriate sportspeople in Slovakia